Witch hat, Witches hat, or Witches' hat may refer to:
 A hat belonging to a witch (witch hat).
 A turret with a conical roof (see also, witch tower).
 A traffic cone.
 A cone shaped playground roundabout that is mounted in such a way that the axis of rotation is free to tilt.
 Hygrocybe conica, a small mushroom in the genus Hygrocybe